Hannara gentis is a moth in the family Lecithoceridae. It was described by Kyu-Tek Park in 2013. It is found in Papua New Guinea.

References

Lecithoceridae
Moths of Papua New Guinea
Moths described in 2013